Women's long distance cross-country classic skiing events at the 2006 Winter Paralympics were contested at Pragelato on 18–19 March.

There were 3 events, of 15 km or 10 km distance. Standings were decided by applying a disability factor to the actual times achieved.

Results

15km Visually impaired
The visually impaired event took place on 19 March. It was won by Lioubov Vasilieva, representing .

10km Sitting
The sitting event took place on 18 March. It was won by Liudmila Vauchok, representing .

15km Standing
The standing event took place on 19 March. It was won by Katarzyna Rogowiec, representing .

References

W
Para